By-elections to the 35th Canadian Parliament were held to fill vacancies in the House of Commons of Canada between the 1993 federal election and the 1997 federal election. The Liberal Party of Canada led a majority government for the entirety of the 35th Canadian Parliament, with little change from by-elections.

Fourteen seats became vacant during the life of the Parliament. Ten of these vacancies were filled through by-elections, and four seats remained vacant when the 1997 federal election was called.

See also
List of federal by-elections in Canada

Sources
 Parliament of Canada–Elected in By-Elections 

1996 elections in Canada
1995 elections in Canada
35th